Dai, also rendered as Tai and sometimes known in historiography as the Tuoba Dai, was a dynastic state of China ruled by the Tuoba clan of Xianbei descent, during the era of Sixteen Kingdoms (although it is not listed as one of the 16). It existed from AD 310 to 376, with its capital at Shengle (near modern Horinger County of Hohhot, Inner Mongolia, China).

The name "Dai" originated when Tuoba Yilu was appointed the Duke of Dai (代公) by the Western Jin dynasty in 310, as a reward for helping Liu Kun, the Governor of Bingzhou (并州), fight against the Xiongnu-led Han Zhao dynasty. The fief was later promoted from a duchy to a principality in 315. Dai was conquered in 376 by the Former Qin dynasty, and its descendants later established the Northern Wei dynasty in 386.

Chieftains of Tuoba Clan 219–377 (as Princes of Dai 315–377)

Tuoba clan family tree

Notes

References

See also 
 List of past Chinese ethnic groups
 Five Barbarians
 Yujiulü Mugulü
 Tuoba clan 

Dynasties in Chinese history
Former countries in Chinese history
History of Inner Mongolia
Tuoba
310 establishments